Donji Štrbci is a village in Croatia.

Population

According to the 2011 census, Donji Štrbci had 14 inhabitants.

Note: In 1857 and 1869 this settlement was part of Bosnia and Herzegovina (that time Ottoman Empire), without census data, so population number is calculated. 1880, 1890 and 1900 data are taken from Bosnia and Herzegovina censuses (under occupation control of Austria-Hungary) from 1879, 1885 and 1895. There is also non-included data for settlement which became part of the Yugoslav federal unit of Bosnia and Herzegovina before the 1948 census. From 1880-1931 name of the settlement was Štrbci, in 1948 Bosanski Štrbci, and since 1953 Donji Štrbci. In 1931 data is included in the settlement of Nebljusi. Settlement of Donji Štrbci became part of that time yugoslav federal unit of Croatia after World War II.

1991 census 

According to the 1991 census, settlement of Donji Štrbci had 50 inhabitants, which were ethnically declared as this:

Austro-hungarian 1910 census 

According to the 1910 census, settlement of Donji Štrbci had 323 inhabitants, which were linguistically and religiously declared as this:

Note: In 1910 census settlement of Donji Štrbci was in Bosnia and Herzegovina.

Literature 

  Savezni zavod za statistiku i evidenciju FNRJ i SFRJ, popis stanovništva 1948, 1953, 1961, 1971, 1981. i 1991. godine.
 Knjiga: "Narodnosni i vjerski sastav stanovništva Hrvatske, 1880-1991: po naseljima, author: Jakov Gelo, izdavač: Državni zavod za statistiku Republike Hrvatske, 1998., ;

References

Populated places in Lika-Senj County